Rachael Domenica Ray (born August 25, 1968) is an American cook, television personality, businesswoman, and author. She hosts the syndicated daily talk and lifestyle program Rachael Ray, and the Food Network series 30 Minute Meals. Other programs to her credit include Rachael Ray's Tasty Travels, $40 a Day, Rachael Ray's Week in a Day, and the reality format shows Rachael vs. Guy: Celebrity Cook-Off and Rachael Ray's Kids Cook-Off. Ray has written several cookbooks based on the 30 Minute Meals concept, and launched a magazine, Every Day with Rachael Ray, in 2006. Ray's television shows have won three Daytime Emmy Awards.

Early life and career

Early life
Rachael Domenica Ray was born in Glens Falls, New York, the daughter of Elsa Providenza Scuderi and James Claude Ray. Her mother's ancestry is Sicilian and her father is French, Scottish, and Welsh.

When Ray was eight, her family moved to Lake George, New York. Her mother managed restaurants in New York's Capital District, including the Lake George Howard Johnson's restaurant, located near the former Gaslight Village amusement park, which attracted many entertainers. Ray also briefly worked at Sutton's Marketplace in Queensbury, New York, and later offered to do commercials for the business. She would continue to promote the establishment, especially their cider donuts and grilled raisin bread. She graduated from Lake George Junior/Senior High School.

In 1995, Ray moved to New York City. She worked first at the Macy's Marketplace candy counter. When Macy's tried to promote her to a buyer in accessories, she moved to Agata & Valentina, a specialty foods store.

1996–2004
Moving back to The Adirondacks, Ray managed Mister Brown's Pub at The Sagamore, a hotel on Lake George. From there, she became a buyer at Cowan & Lobel, a gourmet market in Albany. Ray credits the concept of 30 Minute Meals to her experience working at the store, where she met people who were reluctant to cook. She taught a course in which she showed how to make meals in less than 30 minutes.

With the success of her "30 Minute Meals" classes, WRGB, the local CBS-TV affiliate, asked her to appear in a weekly segment on their newscasts. This, along with a public radio broadcast and the publication of her first book, led to a Today show spot and her first Food Network contract in 2001.

Rachael Ray was a delightful host of the TV show “$40 a Day” for 3 seasons (77 episodes) from 2002 to 2005. She would travel to various destinations and attempt to eat three meals for $40 a day.

2004–2017
Ray, who favors a "quick and easy" cooking style, teaches many simple recipes that she says can be completed in 30 minutes or less, although critics claim her concept does not include preparation time.

Ray says her Sicilian maternal grandfather, Emmanuel Scuderi, and her Cajun ancestry both exert strong influences on her cooking. She uses ingredients such as fresh herbs, garlic, and chicken stock to boost flavors, and believes measuring "takes away from the creative, hands-on process of cooking." She, instead, favors approximations such as "half a palmful" or "two-pan swirl."

To critics of her shortcut techniques, Ray responds, "I have no formal anything. I'm completely unqualified for any job I've ever had." She has also repeatedly said, "I'm not a chef."

On her television programs, she has used catchphrases such as "E-V-O-O" (extra-virgin olive oil), "yum-o", "G.B." (garbage bowl), "Oh my gravy!", "delish," "entréetizer" (entrée-sized appetizer), "stoup" (cross between a soup and stew), and "choup" (thicker than a soup but thinner than a chowder). In 2007, The Oxford American College Dictionary announced the addition of the term EVOO, short for extra-virgin olive oil, which Ray had helped to popularize, and credited her with coining the phrase.

One of Ray's specialties is burgers. She has devoted one of her published works to the topic, The Book of Burger.

Other works

Television
Ray hosted 30 Minute Meals on Food Network for 11 seasons from 2001 to 2012, as well as a revival of the series starting in 2019.

In 2005, she signed a deal to host a syndicated daytime TV talk show. The show, Rachael Ray, premiered on September 18, 2006. Recurrent appearances on The Oprah Winfrey Show were used to fuel the launch, much as Dr. Phil's show was spun off based on his own frequent visits to Oprah. The show tapes in New York City. In coordination with the syndication announcement, Ray said, "People know me for my love of food, but I have so much more I want to share".

On January 12, 2008, Ray's television series Rachael's Vacation premiered on the Food Network. The show was a five-part food travelogue shot in various European countries.

In 2008, Ray became a television executive producer of a short-lived Latin cooking show on the Food Network, called Viva Daisy!, starring Daisy Martínez.

In January 2012, Ray and Guy Fieri were team captains in the Food Network reality series Rachael vs. Guy: Celebrity Cook-Off.

In 2016, Ray guest-starred in the second episode of Gilmore Girls: A Year in the Life, a miniseries revival of Gilmore Girls, as a fictionalized version of herself.

In 2019, Ray fulfilled a long-time goal of voicing a cartoon character when she voiced a character on the Nick Jr. program Butterbean's Café.

In 2023 Ray announced that her talk show will end after its 17th season, and the launch of her production company, "Free Food Studios."

Magazines
In 2003, Ray posed for the men's magazine FHM. Though she was not nude in any of the photos, this drew criticism so harsh, not least of all from Ray's own mother, that in a March 2, 2009 ABC News Nightline interview she gave to Cynthia McFadden, an ABC News correspondent, Ray defended her decision to pose in the magazine. The interview quoted her as saying, "I'd do it again tomorrow."

The Reader's Digest Association launched Ray's magazine Every Day with Rachael Ray on October 25, 2005. The magazine featured seven issues in 2006 and increased to 10 issues in 2007. In October 2011, Meredith Corporation acquired the magazine.

Product endorsements

In November 2006, Ray became a spokeswoman for Nabisco crackers. She appears in commercials and on boxes for the many Nabisco products. Many boxes with Ray's picture have her recipes.

In February 2007, WestPoint Home launched sheets, blankets, and coverlets designed by Ray. Within six months, WestPoint expanded Ray's bed and bath line to include the "Moppine," a two-in-one dish towel/oven mitt, as Ray is often seen with a kitchen towel over her shoulder that doubles for her as an ersatz mitt.

In March 2007, the Dunkin' Donuts company announced Ray as its celebrity endorser, mainly of its coffee, since she had denied being able to make coffee herself. As part of a promotional campaign, Ray describes the company's coffee as "fantabulous."

In May 2007, Ray's recipes were made available on AT&T cellular phones via the "Rachael Ray Recipes on the Run" feature.

In July 2008, Rachael Ray's "Nutrish" pet food was introduced. The dog foods are created from recipes Ray developed for her pit bull, "Isaboo". All proceeds from the sale of these products go to Rachael's Rescue, a charity which Ray organized specifically to provide assistance for at-risk animals.

In December 2016, PulteGroup started Rachael Ray Home Collection for their interior design division. The furniture it markets is all of Ray's own design.

Personal life
On September 24, 2005, in Montalcino, Tuscany, Italy, Ray married John M. Cusimano.  Ray's main residence is located in Lake Luzerne, New York. She also owns a Manhattan Greenwich Village apartment to be near the studio The Lake Luzerne home was destroyed in a fire on August 9, 2020. The next day, a director of emergency services with the county stated that there were no injuries to Ray or her family.

Charity work
In 2006, Ray launched the Yum-O! nonprofit organization. Its mission is to "empower kids and their families to develop healthy relationships with food and cooking. This is achieved by teaching families to cook, feeding hungry kids, and funding cooking education."

Bibliography

Cookbooks

 Rachael Ray's Open House Cookbook (2000)
 Comfort Foods (2001)
 Veggie Meals (2001)
 30-Minute Meals 2 (2003)
 Get Togethers: Rachael Ray 30 Minute Meals (2003)
 Cooking Rocks!: Rachael Ray 30-Minute Meals for Kids (2004)
 $40 a Day: Best Eats in Town (2004)
 Rachael Ray's 30-Minute Meals: Cooking 'Round the Clock (2004)
 Rachael Ray's 30-Minute Meals for Kids: Cooking Rocks! (2004)
 Rachael Ray's 30-Minute Get Real Meals: Eat Healthy Without Going to Extremes (2005)
 Rachael Ray 365: No Repeats: A Year of Deliciously Different Dinners (2005)
 Rachael Ray 2, 4, 6, 8: Great Meals for Couples or Crowds (2006)
 Rachael Ray's Express Lane Meals (2006)
 Rachael Ray's Classic 30-Minute Meals: The All-Occasion Cookbook (2006)
 Rachael Ray: Just in Time (2007)
 Yum-O! The Family Cookbook (2008)
 Rachael Ray's Big Orange Book (2008)
 Rachael Ray's Book of 10: More Than 300 Recipes to Cook Every Day (2009)
 Rachael Ray's Look and Cook (2010)
 The Book of Burger (2012)
 My Year in Meals (2012)
 Week in a Day (2013)
 Guy Food: Rachael Ray's Top 30 30-Minute Meals (2014)
 Kid Food: Rachael Ray's Top 30 30-Minute Meals (2014)
 Comfort Food: Rachael Ray's Top 30 30-Minute Meals (2014)
 Everyone is Italian on Sunday (2015)
 Rachael Ray 50: Memories and Meals from a Sweet and Savory Life: A Cookbook (2019)

Accolades

Emmy Awards and nominations

Other honors
 2004: ranked #92 on "FHM-U.S.'s 100 Sexiest Women 2004"
 2006: ranked #71 on "FHM-U.S.'s 100 Sexiest Women 2006"
 2006: named one of Time magazine's 100 most influential people. She was nominated by fellow Food Network star Mario Batali
 2009: according to Forbes magazine, Ray earned about $15 million in the year ending June 2009, as well as naming her as the 79th most powerful celebrity in the world
 2010: Ray was the inaugural honoree on the Ride of Fame
 2011: People's Choice Award for Favorite TV Cook

References

External links

 
 

1968 births
American cookbook writers
American food writers
American people of French descent
American people of Scottish descent
American writers of Italian descent
American people of Welsh descent
American women restaurateurs
American television chefs
American television talk show hosts
Daytime Emmy Award winners
Food Network chefs
Living people
People from Barnstable County, Massachusetts
People from Glens Falls, New York
People from Lake George, New York
American women chefs
Women cookbook writers
Writers from New York (state)
American women non-fiction writers
21st-century American women